Emma Bates (born July 8, 1992) is an American middle- and long-distance runner. She is a 12-time All-American, the 2014 NCAA 10,000 champion competing for Boise State University, and the 2018 U.S. Women's Marathon Champion.

Professional
In July 2015, Emma Bates signed with BAA High Performance group, moved to Boston, MA. Emma Bates has the women's 10,000 meters standard Athletics at the 2016 Summer Olympics – Qualification from 2015 Payton Jordan Invitational A race. In 2017, Bates moved to Idaho. In 2021, Bates moved to Boulder, Colorado to join Team Boss and is coached by Joe Bosshard.

Competition record

NCAA championships

Outdoor track and field

Indoor track and field

Cross country

Conference championships

Outdoor track and field

Indoor track and field

Cross country

References

External links

Emma Bates Athletics profile

Emma Bates Flocast Interviews

Emma Bates Boise State profile

1992 births
Living people
People from Minnesota
Sportspeople from Minnesota
Sportspeople from Idaho
American female middle-distance runners
American female long-distance runners
Track and field athletes from Minnesota
Track and field athletes from Idaho
Boise State Broncos women's track and field athletes
Boise State University alumni
21st-century American women